Deyan Lozev (born 26 October 1993) is a Bulgarian professional footballer who plays as a right-back or winger for Arda.

Club career
Lozev was signed by Levski Sofia in December 2019. He joined CSKA 1948 in September 2021.

International career
Lozev received his first call-up for senior Bulgarian squad on 8 October 2019 UEFA Euro 2020 qualifying matches against Montenegro and England on 11 and 14 October, replacing Strahil Popov who had gotten injured just before the team's first training session.

References

External links 
 

1993 births
Living people
Bulgarian footballers
FC Lyubimets players
FC Haskovo players
FC Dunav Ruse players
FC Pomorie players
FC Arda Kardzhali players
PFC Levski Sofia players
First Professional Football League (Bulgaria) players
Association football defenders
Association football midfielders
People from Haskovo
Sportspeople from Haskovo Province